Cameron may refer to:

People
 Clan Cameron, a Scottish clan
 Cameron (given name), a given name (including a list of people with the name)
 Cameron (surname), a surname (including a list of people with the name)

Mononym
 Cam'ron (born 1976), stage name of hip hop artist Cameron Giles
 Cameron (architect) (1745–1812), Scottish architect who made an illustrious career at the court of Catherine II of Russia
 Cameron (musician) (born 1978), Iranian-born Swedish pop singer and songwriter
 Cameron (wrestler) (born 1987), professional wrestler (real name Ariane Andrew)
 Marjorie Cameron (1922–1995), occultist and actress who billed herself as "Cameron"

Places

Australia
 Cameron Park, New South Wales

Canada
 Cameron, Manitoba
 Cameron, Peterborough County, Ontario
 Cameron, Ontario, an unincorporated village in the City of Kawartha Lakes
 Papineau-Cameron, Ontario
 Cameron Township, Quebec, merged in 1980 with Bouchette, Quebec
 Cameron Settlement, Nova Scotia
 Cameron Bay

Chile
 Camerón, Chile

Malaysia
 Cameron Highlands District, Malaysia's most extensive hill station area

Scotland
 Cameron, Fife, a parish near St Andrews
 Cameron Bridge, a village in Fife

United States
 Cameron, Arizona
 Cameron, Illinois
 Cameron, Iowa, an unincorporated community in Cerro Gordo County 
 Cameron, Louisiana
 Cameron, Montana
 Cameron, Missouri
 Cameron, New York
 Cameron, North Carolina
 Cameron, Ohio
 Cameron, Oklahoma
 Cameron, South Carolina
 Cameron, Texas
 Cameron, West Virginia
 Cameron County, Pennsylvania
 Cameron County, Texas
 Cameron Parish, Louisiana
 Cameron Parish, Virginia, defunct Anglican parish in Fairfax and Loudoun Counties
 Cameron, Wisconsin (disambiguation)
 Cameron Township (disambiguation)

Other uses
 Cameron (Terminator), fictional character
 Cameron (automobile), American automobile manufacturer 1904–21
 Cameron (crater), lunar crater
 Cameron Balloons, balloon manufacturing company in Bristol, England
 Cameron Coca-Cola, a bottling company
 Cameron International, oil services company
 Cameron University, educational institution in Lawton, Oklahoma

Others 
 Battery Cameron, a Union Army defensive site during the Civil War
 Cameron Airpark, a public use airport located in Cameron Park, El Dorado County, California, United States
 Cameron Airport, a defunct airport in Angleton, Texas, United States
 Cameron Art Museum, formerly known as St. John's Museum of Art, Wilmington, North Carolina
 Cameron Barracks, on Knockentinnel Hill on the eastern outskirts of Inverness, Scotland
 Cameron Blockhouse, a timber blockhouse in Wanganui, New Zealand
 Cameron Chisholm Nicol, an Australian architecture firm
 Cameron City Pool, a historic swimming pool located at Cameron, Marshall County, West Virginia

See also 
 
 Cameroon (disambiguation)
 Camarón (disambiguation)